Hans Pauli Samuelsen (born 18 October 1984) is a retired Faroese professional footballer who played as a left winger.

Club career
Samuelsen started his professional career in EB/Streymur where he stayed for 13 years, playing 309 competitive matches and scoring 93 goals. In 2015, he moved to B36 Tórshavn where he scored his first Champions League goal in the 2015–16 UEFA Champions League First qualifying round. The match ended in a 2–1 loss against Welsh The New Saints in the first leg at home.

International career
Samuelsen has played for both Faroe Islands national U-17 team and Faroe Islands national U-19 team in his youth. He has also played for Faroe Islands national team in the UEFA Euro 2008 qualifying and the 2014 FIFA World Cup qualification, as well as some friendlies, making a total of four appearances in the senior team.

Career statistics

Club

Notes

International

Honours

EB/Streymur
Faroe Islands Premier League: 2008, 2012
Faroe Islands Cup: 2010, 2011
Faroe Islands Super Cup: 2011, 2012, 2013
B36 Tórshavn
Faroe Islands Premier League:  2015
Víkingur
Faroe Islands Premier League:  2016,  2017

References

External links 
 Hans Pauli Samuelsen at FaroeSoccer.com
 
 
 

1984 births
B36 Tórshavn players
Víkingur Gøta players
EB/Streymur players
Association football midfielders
Faroe Islands Premier League players
Faroese footballers
Faroe Islands international footballers
Living people
Faroe Islands youth international footballers
People from Eiði Municipality